Mustafa Agastra (born 4 December 1990 in Lushnjë) is an Albanian football player who most recently played for Tomori in the Albanian First Division.

Club career

Luftëtari
Two days after leaving Tërbuni Pukë, Agastra signed for Albanian First Division side Luftëtari Gjirokastër.

Honours
Individual
Albanian First Division Top Goalscorer (1): 2013–14

References

1990 births
Living people
Sportspeople from Lushnjë
Association football forwards
Albanian men's footballers
KF Teuta Durrës players
KF Apolonia Fier players
KF Tërbuni Pukë players
FK Partizani Tirana players
Luftëtari Gjirokastër players
KF Elbasani players
KS Pogradeci players
FK Tomori Berat players
Kategoria e Parë players
Kategoria Superiore players